Rūja River is a river in Estonia-Latvia border. The river is 77 km long (of which 72 km is in Latvia). The river starts from Ruhijärv and flows into Lake Burtnieks.

References

Rivers of Estonia
Rivers of Latvia